Women & Songs Christmas is the first holiday album in the Women & Songs franchise.

Overview
The album was released on November 10, 2003, nearly two weeks before the seventh regular album in the series was released. 17 holiday-inspired carols are included on the disc, including Natalie Cole, Sarah McLachlan, Jewel, Kim Stockwood, and Vanessa Williams.

As of January 2009, this is the only Christmas album in the Women & Songs franchise.

Track listing
 "My Grown Up Christmas List"
 (performed by Natalie Cole)
 "Song For A Winter's Night"
 (performed by Sarah McLachlan)
 "Hands" (Christmas Version)
 (performed by Jewel)
 "Make It Christmas Day"
 (performed by Jann Arden)
 "Silent Night" (with Dayna Manning)
 (performed by Damhnait Doyle)
 "Winter Wonderland"
 (performed by Tara MacLean)
 "What Child Is This?"
 (performed by Sarah Slean)
 "Rockin' Around the Christmas Tree"
 (performed by The Rankins)
 "River"
 (performed by Linda Ronstadt)
 "Please Come Home for Christmas"
 (performed by Holly Cole)
 "The First Noel"
 (performed by Emmylou Harris)
 "2000 Miles"
 (performed by The Pretenders)
 "I'll Be There Christmas Eve"
 (performed by The Ennis Sisters)
 "Have Yourself a Merry Little Christmas"
 (performed by Vanessa Williams)
 "Get Me Through December" (with Alison Krauss)
 (performed by Natalie MacMaster)
 "It's a Marshmallow World"
 (performed by Kim Stockwood)
 "This Time of the Year"
 (performed by Sophie Milman)

Christmas compilation albums
2003 compilation albums
2003 Christmas albums